The Factor Prize for Southern Art, now renamed the 1858 Prize for Contemporary Southern Art, was established in 2007 with a five year commitment by Elizabeth and Mallory Factor and the Gibbes Museum of Art. It was given annually with a cash prize of $10,000, to "acknowledge an artist whose work contributes to a new understanding of the South" and was the most generous prize of its type in the region. Since 2013 the prize has been awarded by Society 1858. 

The prize may be awarded to an artist who has already produced a body of significant work or whose work shows considerable promise. Eligible artists are those who reside, work or are from Alabama, Arkansas, Florida, Georgia, Louisiana, Mississippi, North Carolina, South Carolina, Tennessee, or Virginia.

Unlike any other award of its type, the design of the Prize creates an archive of information about Southern artists that can be used by curators, collectors, academicians and the public.  Nominations will form the basis of this searchable online archive of Southern artists commencing in early 2008.  

The shortlist for the inaugural prize in 2008 was Jose Alvarez, Radcliff Bailey, William Christenberry, Henri Schindler, Philip Simmons, Stacy Lynn Waddell and Jeff Whetstone. On May 19, 2008, the prize was awarded to Jeff Whetstone, a North Carolina photographer.

Prizewinners

1858 Prize for Contemporary Southern Art
2014 Sonya Clark (fiber and mixed media )

Factor Prize
2012 John Westmark (painting) 
2011 Patrick Dougherty (sculpture) 
2010 Radcliffe Bailey (mixed media) 
2009 Stephen Marc (digital photographic montage} 
2008 Jeff Whetstone (photography}

References

Sources

2008 prize shortlist
inaugural 2008 prize

See also
Gibbes Museum of Art
Mallory Factor

External links
Gibbes Museum of Art
Factor Prize for Southern Art

American visual arts awards
Awards established in 2008